The Jennings State Forest is in the U.S. state of Florida. The  forest is located in northeastern Florida, near Jacksonville. The forest is the home of rare plants such as the Bartram's Ixia and St. John's Susan.

See also
List of Florida state forests
List of Florida state parks

References

External Links
 Jennings State Forest: Florida Division of Forestry- FDACS

Florida state forests
Protected areas of Clay County, Florida
Protected areas of Duval County, Florida